Theodore Newell Wood (July 10, 1909 – October 18, 1982) was an American politician from Pennsylvania who served as a Republican member of the Pennsylvania State Senate for the 20th district from 1947 to 1978.

Biography
Wood was born in Harveys Lake, Pennsylvania.  He served as a member of the Pennsylvania State Senate for the 20th district from 1947 to 1978 and for four years as Luzerne County Commissioner.  He was also a businessman who worked as chairman of the board of Kingston National Bank and President of Pressed Steel Company in Wilkes-Barre, Pennsylvania.

From 1952 to 1956, Wood hosted the Brynfan Tyddyn Road Race around his estate in Pennsylvania. Brynfan Tyddyn is Welsh for "large farm on a hilltop" and the race consisted of 10 laps around a 3.5 mile course around the estate.  The race was discontinued in 1957 after a fatal accident and officials determined the course was too dangerous and difficult for participants and spectators to reach.

In 1979, Wood testified at the bribery trial of U.S. Congressman Daniel Flood that $4,000 in stock given to Flood was a gift for his friendship and not a bribe to assist in the merger of banks that Wood was facilitating.

Wood died on October 18, 1982 and is interred at Fern Knoll Burial Park in Dallas, Pennsylvania.

References

1909 births
1982 deaths
20th-century American politicians
Burials in Pennsylvania
Republican Party Pennsylvania state senators

Luzerne County Councilmembers (Pennsylvania)